Just Desserts, a pun on just deserts, may refer to:

Film and television
 Just Desserts (film), a 2004 TV film by Kevin Connor
 Top Chef: Just Desserts, an American reality competition TV show 2010–2011
 Zumbo's Just Desserts, an Australian reality competition TV show since 2016

Television episodes
 "Just Desserts" (Arthur), 2000
 "Just Desserts" (Cory in the House), 2007
 "Just Desserts!" (The Fairly OddParents), 2005
 "Just Desserts" (Lovejoy), 1991
 "Just Desserts" (Orange Is the New Black), 2019
 "Just Desserts" (Perfect Strangers), 1988
 "Just Desserts" (Porridge), 1975
 "Just Desserts" (The Powerpuff Girls), 2000

Music
 Just Desserts, a 2006 album by Brian Hopper and Robert Fenner
 Just Desserts, a 2013 album by the Waitresses
 "Just Desserts", a 2013 song by Charli XCX and Marina
 "Just Desserts", a 2004 song by Chumbawamba from Un

Other uses
 Just Desserts Café, in Toronto, Ontario, Canada; site of the 1994 Just Desserts shooting
 "Just Desserts", a case in the 2008 video game CSI: NY

See also
 Just deserts (disambiguation)